The Society of Economic Geologists (SEG) is a scientific organization that promotes the study of geology as it relates to mining, mineral exploration, mineral resource classification and mineral extraction. The society's Publication Board publishes the scientific journal Economic Geology. The society serves 7,000+ members worldwide who are committed to advancing the science and the discovery of mineral resources through research, publications, courses, and field trips.

History
SEG began in 1919 with a group of Geological Society of America (GSA) with an interest in economic geology. December 28, 1920, 60 distinguished professionals met and established the organization.

Notable economic geologists
 Pavel Pavlovich Goudkoff (Gudkov) (1921). He was the organizer of the journal "Economic Geology" also.
 Josiah E. Spurr (1923-1924)
 William E. Wrather (1934-1935)
 William O. Hotchkiss, President (1946-1947)
 Anthony J. Naldrett, President (1991-1992)

See also
 List of geoscience organizations

References

External links
 SEG publications (Economic Geology and the SEG Newsletter)
 Geofacets - Geofacets-SEG Millennium Edition
 Official website
 Economic Geology at the GSW website

Geology societies
Economic geology
Mining organizations
1920 establishments in the United States
Scientific organizations established in 1920